Shilong railway station is located in Shilong, Dongguan, Guangdong province, China.

The station was a stop on the Guangshen railway.

The station is split into 2 levels and has 4 platforms. Platforms 1-2 are on the low-level section serving the slow tracks of the Guangshen mainline and were served by pu kuai (local) train services between Shenzhen and Zhaoqing (via Guangzhou East) whilst high-speed CRH services between Guangzhou East and Shenzhen serve the high-level platforms 3 and 4. Unlike other stations on the Guangshen line, there is no waiting room and passengers wait on the platform. Platforms 3 and 4 feature a glass screen with automatic doors which prevents passengers from standing on the platform edge, particularly when non-stopping trains pass through at speeds of 200kmh, and are only opened when the train is in the platform. The station is unusual as platforms 3 and 4 are of a non-standard height and there is a considerable step down from the train to the platform (as well as a considerable gap because of the tight curve through the station) - as a result the CRH1 units serving the line feature an additional lower retracting step for use at Shilong Station.

Shilong station is closer to the downtown areas of Dongguan than the main Dongguan station - therefore many people visiting Dongguan would get off at Shilong. There is a taxi rank and a bus station serving both Shilong town services and Dongguan city buses.

There were approx. 4 trains per hour in each direction between Guangzhou / Guangzhou East and Shenzhen. On January 8, 2014, Shilong railway station was closed for passenger train services; all passenger train services were moved to Dongguan railway station.

References

Railway stations in Guangdong
Railway stations closed in 2014
Stations on the Guangzhou–Shenzhen Railway